Mary Elizabeth Downey (c. 1872 – May 25, 1949) was a librarian and activist who created and promoted library science education courses across the Midwestern and Western United States. She is regarded as a pioneer of the modern library movement.

Early life and education
Mary Elizabeth Downey was born in Sarahsville, Ohio around 1872 to Dr. Hiram James and Martha Ball Downey. She was raised in a middle-class, Protestant family, and taught in her local public schools. In 1899, she earned a B.A. in classics from Denison University. She then studied library science from 1899 to 1901 through the University of Chicago Extension Division and was one of only seventeen students to graduate.

Career
After graduating from the University of Chicago Extension Division, she took a position as first assistant librarian with the Field Museum in Chicago and worked there until 1902. Records show that she also worked as a faculty member of the University of Chicago Extension Division's library school around the same time and wrote a letter to the university's president in defense of the program after it was criticized by the ALA. In 1903, the decision was made to close the library school. Downey, acting as President of the University of Chicago Library Students Club, wrote another letter to the dean of the university, requesting that the school show loyalty to its students by keeping the program open and continuing its work. Neither her letter nor the many other letters of protest the university received dissuaded President William Rainey Harper from closing the school.

Downey moved on to Ottumwa, Iowa, where she became the town's first public librarian, receiving recommendations from her former instructor and University of Chicago librarian Zella Allen Dixson, the dean of women of Shephardson College, the pastor of the local Baptist church, a teacher at the local high school, the librarian of the Art Institute of Chicago, and President Harper of the University of Chicago.

Dr. Suzanne M. Stauffer writes in her article, "'She Speaks as One Having Authority': Mary E. Downey's Use of Libraries as a Means to Public Power":

During her time in Ottumwa Downey began a story hour in the library, invited Friends of the Library to give presentations on books, and gave talks on the history of the book and the library at the high school. She also established the Children's Library League, which met weekly to read and discuss books, with the motto 'Clean hearts, clean hands, and clean books.'

Downey was elected secretary of the Iowa Library Association for the 1904 to 1905 term. Around this time, she and several other female librarians accused Melvil Dewey of sexual harassment, which ultimately led to him being expelled from both the ALA and the New York Library Association. In 1906, Downey became the director of the Chautauqua School for Librarians, a short-course summer school which Downey would expand in 1918 into a professional certificate program. She acted as the school's director every summer for thirty years.

In 1908, Downey became Ohio's state library organizer. Stauffer writes that Downey's main duties were to "encourage tax support for libraries, assist with the organization and cataloging of collections and the standardization of library procedures, increase the use of libraries, develop library extension, and encourage formal library training. In 1910 alone she made 216 visits to 116 towns; gave twenty-six addresses in support of the library movement to mass meetings, women's clubs, teachers' institutes, and other groups; and presided over district library meetings in six cities." In her addresses to the teachers' institutes, she called for teachers to utilize public libraries in education, promote the reading of "good books" (i.e. books that encouraged good morals), and provide education for librarians. She also represented the state of Ohio in the meetings of the Ohio Library Association, the American Library Association, the League of Library Commissions, the Ohio Federation of Women's Clubs, and the General Federation of Women's Clubs.

In 1911, the governor of Ohio appointed a new state librarian who cleared out much of the staff, including Downey. Downey went on to serve two terms as the president of the Ohio Library Association before being offered the position of Utah state library organizer in 1914 with a recommendation from American Library Association secretary George Utley. Her main duty as Utah library organizer was to spend ten to fourteen days at each library in the state training the staff and library boards in procedures and policies. In 1916, she took on the position of state library secretary while continuing to work as organizer. After two years, Downey had visited every library in Utah multiple times, calling for tax-funded libraries, assisting with Carnegie grant applications, evaluating the libraries, recommending materials, and speaking before community groups.

Downey once gave a speech to the Utah Federation of Women's Clubs in Salt Lake City, stating:

Downey pushed for the passage of the County Public Libraries Act which established a county library system in Utah that provided public libraries to rural areas.  The Act was passed in 1919 not long after the end of World War I, and Downey convinced the Library War Service to donate its unused books to Utah's new, rural county libraries.

Throughout her career, Downey continued to promote education for librarians by offering Utah librarians scholarships to the Chautauqua School, starting a traveling school that would hold six-week sessions in various places in Utah, and calling for library boards to pay for their librarians to attend school.

In 1921, Downey became the state library organizer for North Dakota and began reforming the state's libraries just as she had in Utah by calling for a county library system. Downey then returned to Denison University in 1923 as the school's librarian and received her M.A. there the following year.

In 1929, Downey was reappointed Ohio state library organizer—a position which she would hold until 1931.

Later life
In 1941, Downey became a volunteer librarian at the National Woman's Party's Alva Belmont Feminist Library, now known as the Florence Bayard Hilles Feminist Library, which continues to specialize in materials about the women's movement. Downey organized the library's initial collection and promoted women's issues through a variety of mediums throughout her time there.
Mary Elizabeth Downey died on May 25, 1949 in Virginia Beach, Virginia. Her obituary labeled her a pioneer of the library movement.

Personal Views & Activism

Religion & Books
In 1902, Downey gave an address to the Iowa Library Association advocating that librarians "not force even a child into using the library, but if possible, lead [the child] voluntarily into the reading habit..." Downey believed that librarians could instill cultural norms and mores in children by providing them with books that encouraged adherence to those values. She would reiterate this message in public lectures she delivered at the Chautauqua School for Librarians. As Stauffer writes:

Speaking in the Hall of Philosophy on 'The Evolution of the Library,' Downey concluded that 'it is the birthright of every child to have access to a good collection of books just as it is his birthright to have a free education' and declared that 'the development of a love for regular and for good reading is necessary to bring the child to the proper development.'

Downey also spoke before the American Library Association's Religious Books Round Table in 1932 and advocated the use of inspirational materials to help people who were struggling in the Great Depression.

Literacy and education
Downey advised schools to have at least one book per child in the classroom and called for rural schools to house branch libraries in order to encourage the creation of the first "generation of readers." Downey stated in speeches that public libraries could provide all the benefits of a university for the entire community.

In 1923, Downey spoke to the Daughters of the American Revolution, stating:

Feminism
Downey was a member of the Columbus Equal Suffrage Association and advocated for women's right to vote. She would later work for the National Woman's Party and promote feminist literature in libraries.

Downey spoke out for women's equal employment in libraries by joining several other female librarians in asking the War Service Committee to stop protecting women from hard work. She also wrote a letter to the executive secretary of the Library War Service asking that the military lift its ban on women in the Camp Library Service.

Professional Associations
Downey served on the Publications Committee of the League of Library Commissions in 1911, as the League's second vice president in 1914, and then on the executive board from 1915 to 1918.

Downey was a member of the American Library Association Council from 1914 to 1916 due to her position as president of the Ohio Library Association at the time. She would rejoin the Council in 1920 when she became president of the Utah Library Association and again in 1922 when she became president of the North Dakota Library Association. In 1923, she was appointed to a five-year term on the Council. Downey also served on the American Library Association's Committee on Legislation from 1920 to 1927.

See also
 North Dakota State Library
 Public libraries in North America
 American Library Association
 General Federation of Women's Clubs
 National Woman's Party
 Feminism in the United States
 Women's suffrage in the United States

Further reading
 Downey, Mary Elizabeth. "Chautauqua School for Librarians." Library Journal 47 (1922): 455-57.
 Downey, Mary Elizabeth. "The County and the State." Bulletin of the American Library Association 17 (1923): 287-92.
 Downey, Mary Elizabeth. Developing a Public Library (Columbus: Ohio Board of Library Commissioners, Department of Library Organization, 1911).
 Downey, Mary Elizabeth. "Library Courses in the College, University and Normal School Curriculum." Library Journal 53 (1928): 349-52.
 Downey, Mary Elizabeth. Library Extension in Ohio (Columbus: Ohio Board of Library Commissioners, Department of Library Organization, 1911).
 Downey, Mary Elizabeth. "A Library Survey of Utah." Utah Survey 3, no. 7 (1916): 4-11.
 Downey, Mary Elizabeth. “Literature and Culture.” Library Journal 40 (1915): 163-168.
 Downey, Mary Elizabeth. "Making Religious Books Popular." Library Journal 57 (1932): 1030-34.
 Downey, Mary Elizabeth. "New Feminist Library in Washington." Library Journal 69 (1944): 181-84.
 Downey, Mary Elizabeth. "Pioneering in Utah." Bulletin of the American Library Association 9, no. 4 (1915).
 Downey, Mary Elizabeth. Reading in Rural Communities (Columbus: Ohio Board of Library Commissioners, Department of Library Organization, 1911).
 Downey, Mary Elizabeth. "Recruiting for Librarianship through the College Library." Library Journal 56 (1931): 390-93.
 Downey, Mary Elizabeth. Report of Library Organizer: Reprinted from Report of Board of Library Commissioners of Ohio for the Year Ending November 15, 1910 (Columbus: Ohio Board of Library Commissioners, Department of Library Organization, 1911).
 Downey, Mary Elizabeth. "State Library Extension Work." Year Book (Utah Federation of Women's Clubs) (1915–16): 62-63.
 Downey, Mary Elizabeth. "What a County Library Will Do for North Dakota." Journal of the National Education Association 12 (1923): 94.
 Downey, Mary Elizabeth. "Work of Student Assistants in College Libraries." Library Journal 57 (1932): 417-20.
 "Who's Who: Miss Mary E. Downey." Chautauquan Daily, 10 July 1915, 6.
 "Who's Who: Miss Mary E. Downey." Chautauquan Daily, 11 July 1922, 7.

References

Notes

Bibliography
 "D. A. R. Meeting." Chautauquan Daily, 18 July 1923, 7.
 "Entire City to Join in Celebration over Our Splendid Library." Price News-Advocate, 3 March 1916, 1.
 "Florence Bayard Hilles Feminist Library." Sewall-Belmont House & Museum. Retrieved April 10, 2016.
 Garrison, Dee. Apostles of Culture: The Public Librarian and American Society, 1876-1920 (New York: Free Press, 1979), 206-217.
 Mary Elizabeth Downey obituary, Library Journal 75 (1950).
 "Miss Downey Talks," Ottumwa Courier, 29 October 1902.
 "Mr. Barnes and Miss Downey," Chautauquan Daily, 12 July 1915, 3.
 Stauffer, Suzanne M. "'Mr. Dewey Is Crazy and Katharine Sharp Hates the University of Chicago:' Gender, Power, and Personality and the Demise of the University of Chicago Course in Library Science 1897-1903." Journal of Education for Library and Information Science 56, no. 2 (Spring 2015): 101-113.
 Stauffer, Suzanne M. "'She Speaks as One Having Authority': Mary E. Downey's Use of Libraries as a Means to Public Power." Libraries & Culture 40, no. 1 (Winter 2005): 38-62.
 Utley, George B. to Howard R. Driggs, 9 February 1914, Utah State Library Commission, Correspondence, 1912–22, Utah State Archives, Salt Lake City.
 Wiegand, W.A. Irrepressible reformer: A biography of Melvil Dewey. Chicago: American Library Association, 1996.

External links
 American Library Association
 General Federation of Women's Clubs
 Sewall-Belmont House & Museum

1870s births
1949 deaths
American feminists
American librarians
American women librarians
American suffragists
Denison University alumni
University of Chicago alumni